The Roller Blade Seven is a 1991 cult martial arts film directed by Donald G. Jackson, written by Jackson and Scott Shaw, produced by Jackson and Shaw, and starring Shaw, Frank Stallone, Karen Black, Joe Estevez, Don Stroud, and William Smith.

Plot and style
The Roller Blade Seven unfolds in an abstract, dreamlike structure, utilizing minimal dialogue and repetition of footage in key scenes. Several sequences occur repeatedly, such as a scene in which the protagonist is seen to get on his motorcycle and ride out of a car-park eight times in a row, leaving from a different parking bay each time.

The film follows Hawk Goodman (Scott Shaw) who is sent on a mission by Father Donaldo (Donald G. Jackson) to rescue his sister, Sister Sparrow Goodman, from the clutches of the evil overlord Pharaoh (William Smith) in the apocalyptic world of the future. The film takes place in a region known as the Wheelzone whose populace travels solely by the means of roller skates or skateboards. Hawk, however, arrives riding a Harley Davidson motorcycle.

Sister Sparrow has been abducted from the Master of Light Institute by the evil Saint Offender (Joe Estevez). Before Hawk can complete his task, he must take psychedelic mushrooms with cult movie actress Karen Black and learn to rollerblade. Armed only with his samurai sword, Hawk does battle with the Black Knight (Frank Stallone), rollerblading ninjas and other gangs that inhabit the Wheelzone. Joining him on this mission are a Kabuki mime with a wiffle bat, a rollerblading banjo player entirely swathed in bandages and a pacifist named Stella Speed.

Pharaoh's minions have been abducting women to make them his slaves. He explains that he uses a wheelchair due to an old skateboarding accident, and he longs for the days when he used to be able to ride a skateboard.

"Hawk's quest sees him chewing magic mushrooms with Karen Black, confronts murderous William Smith, wheel-chair bound Pharaoh and team up with blonde sake-enforcer Stella Speed. There's a lot of lame faux-fights with skate freaks in metal demon/ninja horns/bondage gear and/or kabuki makeup".

Cast
 Scott Shaw as Hawk Goodman
 Joe Estevez as Saint O'ffender
 Allison Chase as Stella Speed
 Don Stroud as Conga Man
 Karen Black as Tarot
 Frank Stallone as Black Knight
 Rhonda Shear as Officer Daryl Skates
 William Smith as Pharaoh
 Jill Kelly as Deserette

Zen filmmaking
Shaw and Jackson described the Roller Blade Seven as the first example of Zen filmmaking. This is a style of filmmaking in which no scripts are used.

"Although it is directed by Donald G. Jackson of Hell Comes to Frogtown and other titles like Lingerie Kickboxer, Rollergator, and Ghost Taxi actor, writer and experimental martial artist is more often recognized as the creative force behind the movie. He calls his unique approach to cinema Zen Filmmaking, which is a system that favors shooting whatever you feel like".

Reception
Jim Vorel of Paste ranked the film #27 on his list of the 100 best B movies of all time, and wrote: "The Roller Blade Seven pretty easily manages to be the most psychedelic, mind-bending film on this entire list—my attempts to describe here only hint at its profound weirdness. It's a movie that is indescribable until you experience it".

Sequels
The Roller Blade Seven was followed by Return of the Roller Blade Seven. There was then a version of the film created by combining footage from The Roller Blade Seven and Return of the Roller Blade Seven that was titled, Legend of the Roller Blade Seven. This version of the film was shown on USA Up All Night.

References

External links
 
 The Roller Blade Seven official website
 Return of the Roller Blade Seven official website

1991 films
1991 action films
1991 independent films
1991 martial arts films
1990s science fiction films
American post-apocalyptic films
Roller skating films
1990s English-language films
Films directed by Donald G. Jackson
1990s American films